Peter Masters has been the Minister of the Metropolitan Tabernacle (Spurgeon's) in central London since 1970. He started the Evangelical Times, an evangelical conservative newspaper. He directs the School of Theology, an annual conference for pastors and Christian workers.

Sword and Trowel
He edits the international magazine 'Sword & Trowel' (started by Spurgeon in 1865).

London Reformed Baptist Seminary
He initiated the London Reformed Seminary in 1976 and directs the further studies of both pastors and aspiring pastors in the Tabernacle's adjunct seminary.  The seminary went online from 2011.

Authorship
He has authored 28 books, which have been translated into at least 28 other languages.

Broadcasts 
His sermons have been broadcast in the UK since 2003 on the Sky channel UCB. In 2013 it transferred to the Sky channel Revelation TV, it is broadcast every Saturday evening. These broadcasts include a sermon from Masters and an accompanying apologetic or biographical feature. Current UK channels are Sky Channel 581, Freeview HD Channel 241 and Freesat Channel 692. Programmes are also broadcast on a number of overseas radio stations including in New Zealand and the US.

Distinctive ministerial emphases

The necessity of regular Gospel preaching
He has lobbied for the necessity of distinctive and frequent evangelistic addresses, and lamented the loss of this amongst evangelical ministers.

Separatism
By calling other ministers to remember and consider the Downgrade Controversy, Masters has advocated a duty of ministerial separation from churches that do not follow the major principles of historical evangelical doctrine, such as the necessity of regeneration, justification by faith without works, and belief in infallibility of the Bible. In this he has repeated the call of Martyn Lloyd-Jones, in his controversy with John Stott, to separate from non-evangelical churches, and followed in the tradition of E. J. Poole-Connor, the founder of the Fellowship of Independent Evangelical Churches.

Charismatic movement
He has opposed and challenged the teaching of the Charismatic Movement that New Testament sign gifts are still extant, arguing that the Bible contains the promise that it is both sufficient and complete, rendering new revelation both redundant and dangerous. This view has been described as cessationist. He has, upon the same grounds, critiqued claims of the gift of miraculous healing as spurious, lacking credibility and sometimes occultic.

Young Earth Creationist
He opposes Darwinism, which some evangelicals have seen historically as a form of humanist propaganda, and as a doctrine viewed as at variance with the first books of the Bible. He helped found the Newton Scientific Association, and has supported lectures and talks examining alleged weaknesses of the theory of evolution.

Selected works currently in print

 Healing Epidemic, 1988
 Necessity of Sunday Schools: In This Post-Christian Era, 1992
 Should Christians Drink?: The Case for Total Abstinence, 1992
 Biblical Strategies for Witness, 1994
 Only One Baptism of the Holy Spirit, 1995
 The Baptist Confession of Faith 1689: Or, the Second London Confession with Scripture Proofs, Revised edition, 1998
 Do We Have a Policy?: Paul's Ten Point Policy for Church Health and Growth, 2002
 Worship in the Melting Pot, 2002
 Physicians of Souls: The Gospel Ministry, 2002
 The Lord's Pattern for Prayer, 2003
 God's Rules for Holiness: Unlocking the Ten Commandments, 2003
 Men of Purpose, Latest edition, 2003
 Heritage of Evidence: In the British Museum, 2004
 The Mutual Love of Christ and His People, 2004
 Not Like Any Other Book: Interpreting the Bible, 2004
 Joshua's Conquest: Was It Moral? And What Does It Say to Us Today? 2005
 Missionary Triumph Over Slavery: William Knibb and Jamaican Emancipation, 2006
 The Faith, Great Christian Truths, 2006
 Men of Destiny, 6th edition, 2008
 Steps for Guidance in the Journey of Life, 2008
 Church Membership in the Bible, 2008
 Faith, Doubts, Trials and Assurance, 2006, 
 World Dominion: The High Ambition of Reconstructionism [a critique], 1990,
 Psalms & Hymns of Reformed Worship (editor), 1991
 The Personal Spiritual Life, 2013
 The Charismatic Illusion, 2016
 Charismatic Phenomenon, Jun 1988
 The Preacher’s Library, 1979 
 Remember the Prisoners, 1986

References

External links 
 The Metropolitan Tabernacle's website
 The Tabernacle Bookshop

Year of birth missing (living people)
Living people
20th-century Calvinist and Reformed theologians
21st-century Calvinist and Reformed theologians
English Baptist theologians
Cessationism
Christian Young Earth creationists
Christianity in London
English Baptist ministers
English Calvinist and Reformed theologians
English evangelists
English male non-fiction writers